Alan Morton (born 13 April 1950) is an English former professional footballer who played in the Football League as a forward.

Morton holds the modern record for a single season goalscoring for Ashford Town (Kent), scoring 46 goals in 59 games in all competitions in 1972/73.

Morton played a total of 361 games for Woking in all competitions, scoring 178 goals.

References

1950 births
Living people
Footballers from Erith
English footballers
Association football forwards
Woking F.C. players
Crystal Palace F.C. players
Stockport County F.C. players
Nuneaton Borough F.C. players
Fulham F.C. players
Wimbledon F.C. players
Maidstone United F.C. (1897) players
Ashford United F.C. players
Kingstonian F.C. players
Wokingham Town F.C. players
Walton & Hersham F.C. players
Farnborough F.C. players
Epsom & Ewell F.C. players
Westfield F.C. (Surrey) players
English Football League players
National League (English football) players